The Pump House Gang is a 1968 collection of essays and journalism by Tom Wolfe.  The stories in the book explored various aspects of the counterculture of the 1960s.  The most famous story in the collection, from which the book takes its name, is about Jack Macpherson and his gang of surfers that frequented a sewage pump house at Windansea Beach in La Jolla, California.

Publication
The Pump House Gang was published on the same day in 1968 as The Electric Kool-Aid Acid Test, Wolfe's story about the LSD-fueled adventures of Ken Kesey and the Merry Pranksters.  They were Wolfe's first books since The Kandy-Kolored Tangerine-Flake Streamline Baby in 1965 which, like The Pump House Gang, was a collection of Wolfe's non-fiction essays.

Though both books were well received and would go on to become best-sellers, of the two The Electric Kool-Aid Acid Test was hailed as an instant classic and would become the better-known of the two books.

Writing
All but two of the stories in the book were written in 1965 and 1966, during the ten months after the publication of The Kandy-Kolored Tangerine-Flake Streamline Baby.   During this period Wolfe spent extensive time with many of his subjects, including Hugh Hefner, the founder of Playboy magazine (whom Wolfe famously compared to The Great Gatsby); Carol Doda, a stripper who helped popularize breast implants; and the surfers of the pump house.

Other subjects Wolfe profiles in the book include actress Natalie Wood, the New York Hilton, then-Mod Joan Juliet Buck, the visionary media-theorist Marshall McLuhan and various socialites of New York.  The essays collectively tell the story of the new status symbols and lifestyles of the 1960s and how the culture was changing from the traditional social hierarchies of the time.  The success of the book cemented Wolfe as one of his generation's most prominent social critics.

Style
The stories in The Pump House Gang are written in the style of New Journalism that Wolfe and other writers like Joan Didion and Gay Talese helped to popularize.  According to  Time magazine's review of Wolfe's book:

He uses a language that explodes with comic-book words like "POW!" and "boing." His sentences are shot with ellipses, stabbed with exclamation points, or bombarded with long lists of brand names and anatomical terms. He is irritating, but he did develop a new journalistic idiom that has brought relief from standard Middle-High Journalese.

Wolfe's style was simultaneously mocked and widely imitated.  In 1990 the Los Angeles Times interviewed many of the surfers who had been involved with the pump house gang.  Some of the surfers claimed that Wolfe took liberties with the facts to embellish and mythologize the lifestyle of the surfers.  Other members of the pump house gang believe Wolfe's characterizations were correct.

Contents 
The Pump House Gang contains fifteen stories:
 "The Pump House Gang"
 "The Mid-Atlantic Man"
 "King of the Status Dropouts"
 "The Put-Together Girl"
 "The Noonday Underground"
 "The Shockkkkkk of Recognition"
 "The Hair Boys"
 "What if He Is Right?"
 "Bob and Spike"
 "Tom Wolfe's New Book of Etiquette"
 "The Life & Hard Times of a Teenage London Society Girl"
 "The Private Game"
 "The Automated Hotel"
 "The Mild Ones"
 "O Rotten Gotham—Sliding Down into the Behavioral Sink"

References

1968 books
Essay collections by Tom Wolfe
Books about California
Farrar, Straus and Giroux books